Mussardia griseoplagiata is a species of beetle in the family Cerambycidae, and the only species in the genus Mussardia. It was described by Stephan von Breuning in 1959.

References

Pteropliini
Beetles described in 1959